The Men's skeet pairs event took place at 11 October 2010 at the CRPF Campus.

Results

External links
Reports

Shooting at the 2010 Commonwealth Games